Following is a list of senators of Calvados, people who have represented the department of Calvados in the Senate of France.

Third Republic

Senators for Calvados under the French Third Republic were:

 Édouard Bocher (1876–1894)
 Charles-Pierre-Paul Paulmier (1876–1885)
 Louis de Saint-Pierre (1876–1890)
 Alexandre Lavalley (1885–1892)
 Louis Tillaye (1895–1913)
 Hippolyte Turgis (1890–1904) 
 Norbert Anne (1892–1894) 
 Paul Duchesne-Fournet (1894–1906)
 Louis Saint-Quentin (1904–1928)
 Henry Chéron (1913–1936)
 Paul Boivin-Champeaux (1907–1925)
 Jean Boivin-Champeaux (1928–1945)
 Charles d'Harcourt (1925–1945)
 Camille Cautru (1936–1945)

Fourth Republic

Senators for Calvados under the French Fourth Republic were:

Fifth Republic 
Senators for Calvados under the French Fifth Republic:

References

Sources

 
Lists of members of the Senate (France) by department